Maria Mileaf (born  in New York City) is an American theater director. She grew up in Highland Park, New Jersey.

Mileaf received a BA in literature from Yale College and received an MFA in directing from University of California, San Diego in 1990. In 1994, she was awarded a Boris Sagal and Bill Foeller Fellowship from the Williamstown Theatre Festival. She lives in NYC with her husband, set designer Neil Patel, and their two children.

Theater directing credits

Film directing credits

Awards and nominations

References

External links
Maria Mileaf at the Lortel Off-Broadway database

.

American theatre directors
Women theatre directors
Yale College alumni
University of California, San Diego alumni
Artists from New York City
1968 births
Living people